Andrea Navedo is an American actress, singer, and published author. She began her career on the daytime soap operas One Life to Live (1995–97) and Guiding Light (1999-2000), and in later years had several supporting roles on primetime television. From 2014 to 2019, Navedo starred as Xiomara "Xo" Villanueva in The CW comedy-drama series, Jane the Virgin.

Early life 
A second-generation New York Puerto Rican, Navedo grew up in New York City. She said she relates to her Jane the Virgin character because her mother was also a young single mother. Navedo graduated from DeWitt Clinton High School in 1988 and graduated from the State University of New York at Old Westbury in 1998 with a B.A. in Communicative and Creative Arts with a concentration in theater. Navedo was also featured in a DeWitt Clinton notable alumni article alongside other famous alumni such as Stan Lee.

Career 
Navedo began her professional acting career on the daytime soap operas. From 1995 to 1997, she played the role of Linda Soto in the ABC soap opera, One Life to Live. In 1999, she joined the cast of CBS soap opera Guiding Light as Theresa Sandoval. She made her film debut with small part in Girl 6 (1996), and later guest starred in episodes of New York Undercover and The District. In 2001, Navedo co-starred in the action comedy film, Double Take and the following year in the drama film Washington Heights.

From 2001 to 2004, Navedo had a recurring role on the NBC legal crime series, Law & Order, as Detective Ana Cordova. later guest-starred on Law & Order: Criminal Intent, Damages and Blue Bloods. Navedo also has appeared in the number of films such as El Cantante and Remember Me. From 2011 to 2013, Navedo also had the recurring roles on How to Make It in America, Golden Boy and Law & Order: Special Victims Unit. She starred in the comedy film Superfast!, the parody of The Fast and the Furious film series, which was released in 2015.

In 2014, Navedo was cast in the series regular role of Xiomara "Xo" Villanueva, title character's mother (played by Gina Rodriguez) in The CW critically acclaimed comedy-drama series, Jane the Virgin. She received the 2015 Imagen Award for Best Supporting Actress – Television for her performance. The series ended in 2019 after five seasons. In 2017, she appeared in the fantasy crime film Bright starring Will Smith. In 2020, she was cast as 
civil rights activist Carmen Delgado Votaw in the Hulu miniseries Mrs. America.

Personal life 
Navedo is in a relationship with Bob Sewell, CEO and founder of Bellwether Investment Management. She has two children, a daughter (Ava) and a son (Nico).

Filmography

Film

Television

Awards and nominations

References

External links 
 
 

Living people
Year of birth missing (living people)
20th-century American actresses
21st-century American actresses
Actresses from New York City
American actresses of Puerto Rican descent
American film actresses
American soap opera actresses
American television actresses
DeWitt Clinton High School alumni
People from the Bronx
State University of New York at Old Westbury alumni